Kezia Burrows is a Welsh actress, known for portraying the role of Dr Cath Llewelyn in the BBC Wales medical drama Crash from 2009 to 2010.

Life and career
Born in Neath, she lived in Porthcawl and then Carmarthen But sites being from the seaside cardigan village New Quay, where both her parents are from. Burrows trained at RADA, graduating in 2004. She first took roles in various theatre productions. She made her first television appearance in ITV1's The Capgras Tide, before starring in the 2009 BBC Wales medical drama Crash as Dr Cath Llewelyn. In 2013, Burrows voiced Nilin, the protagonist of the action-adventure video game Remember Me. Since her first game she has both voiced and mocapped / performance captured a combined total of over 100 games, amongst them likeness and performance capture for Amanda Ripley in 2014's Alien Isolation, likeness voice and performance capture for Cass Vallance in Star Citizen / Squadron 42. Television work includes more recently the remake of The Snow Spider in 2020, Apple Tree Yard & Doctor Foster

Filmography

Film

Television

Video games

References

External links
 

21st-century Welsh actresses
British television actresses
Living people
People from Neath
People from Carmarthenshire
Alumni of RADA
Welsh film actresses
Welsh stage actresses
Welsh television actresses
Welsh video game actresses
Welsh voice actresses
Year of birth missing (living people)